This list is of the Cultural Properties of Japan designated in the category of  for the Prefecture of Okayama.

National Cultural Properties
As of 1 February 2017, two Important Cultural Properties have been designated, being of national significance.

Prefectural Cultural Properties
As of 29 November 2016, eight properties have been designated at a prefectural level.

See also
 Cultural Properties of Japan
 List of National Treasures of Japan (historical materials)
 List of Historic Sites of Japan (Okayama)
 Okayama Prefectural Museum

References

External links
  Cultural Properties in Okayama Prefecture

Cultural Properties,historical materials
Cultural Properties,historical materials
Historical materials,Okayama